Brian Best (born December 12, 1959) is an American businessman and politician currently serving in the Iowa House of Representatives from the 11th District. A Republican, he has served in the Iowa House of Representatives since 2015.

, Best serves on several committees in the Iowa House – the Appropriations, Commerce, Human Resources, and Transportation committees.

Electoral history 
Best was elected in 2014, defeating incumbent representative, Democrat Dan Muhlbauer. He was reelected in 2016, besting Democratic opponent Ken Myers.

References

External links 

 Brian Best official Iowa General Assembly site
 Profile at Iowa House Republicans

1959 births
Living people
Republican Party members of the Iowa House of Representatives
University of Northern Iowa alumni
21st-century American politicians